Phet or King of Banyongrattanat Palace or known as the King Thaisa (meaning "King of the Poolside" because he often lives in the Banyongrattanat Palace, which is located beside the pool) was the King of Ayutthaya from 1709 to 1733 and the third ruler from the Ban Phlu Luang dynasty.

Reign
King of Banyongrattanat Palace was born Prince Phet  to King Sanphet VIII and his principal queen. After the death of his father in 1709 Prince Phet was crowned as King of Siam and took the reigning name Phumintharacha. He appointed his brother Prince Phon as the Prince Viceroy in First Class. The king was said to be very fond of silver barb that he forbade anyone but himself from fishing them or else they would be fined, and he likes to fish often in the pool beside Banyongrattanat Palace, where he came to live regularly. This earned him the epithet "Angler King". His reign was marked by the building of many canals, and "large sea-going vessels".  Siam also exported many live elephants.

Invasion of Cambodia

In the early reign of King Thai Sa, there was a royal succession conflict in Cambodia. Prince Ang Tong and his younger brother, Prince Kaev Hua III, were fighting for the throne of Cambodia. In 1715, Nguyễn Phúc Chu the Nguyen lord who supported King Kaev Hua III invaded Oudong and King Thommo Reachea III and Prince Ang Tong along with their families fled to Ayutthaya for protection. King Tai Sa ordered Chao Phraya Chakri to invade Cambodia to restore King Thommarcha in 1717. The Siamese fleets suffered defeat by the Vietnamese at Banteay Mas yet on the land the Siamese were able to reach Oudong in 1718 and eliminated Vietnamese troops in the city. King Keao Fa, however, took negotiating measures. He agreed to pay tribute to the Siamese court as Ayutthaya's vassal state in exchange for the Siamese's acknowledgment of him as the legitimate king of Cambodia.

Succession crisis
King Thai Sa had three sons - Prince Narenthon, Prince Aphai and Prince Poramet. In 1732, while King Thai Sa was on his deathbed he gave the throne to Prince Aphai since Prince Narenthon, his elder brother had entered the priesthood. The two remaining princes rose in armed rebellion against their uncle. Prince Phon, the younger son of Sanphet VIII managed to defeat his nephews and took the throne as King Borommakot.

Death
As it appears in the archives of the French bishopric coming in Ayutthaya time by Adrien Louney that he has an abscess in his mouth or throat, while in the Autthaya Chronicle by Chat, Phra Chakkraphatphong it was recorded that he had a tongue disease. It therefore often assumed that he may have had the oral cancer, which may have been squamous cell carcinoma. He was suffeing from this disease for a long time until his death on 13 January 1733.  After that prince Aphai, the hereditary prince who claimed the throne, and prince Poremet fought a battle with Prince Phon, the prince Viceroy, the King's brother.

Issue

Ancestry

References

1733 deaths
Kings of Ayutthaya
Ban Phlu Luang dynasty
Year of birth unknown
18th-century monarchs in Asia
Thai male Chao Fa 
Princes of Ayutthaya
18th-century Thai people
18th-century Thai monarchs